Tosunlar can refer to:

 Tosunlar, Çayırlı
 Tosunlar, Devrek
 Tosunlar, Sarayköy